Ann A. Mullen (October 24, 1935 – April 17, 1994) was an American politician who served as mayor of Gloucester Township, New Jersey and represented New Jersey's 4th legislative district in the New Jersey General Assembly.

Born in Philadelphia, Mullen was a graduate of John Bartram High School.

From Erial, Camden County, New Jersey, Mullen was a Democrat who served as mayor of Gloucester Township, New Jersey from 1979 until her death in 1994. From 1990 to 1992, Mullen also served in the New Jersey General Assembly. Mullen died at West Jersey Hospital in Marlton, New Jersey.

References

1935 births
1994 deaths
John Bartram High School alumni
People from Gloucester Township, New Jersey
Politicians from Philadelphia
Women state legislators in New Jersey
Mayors of places in New Jersey
Democratic Party members of the New Jersey General Assembly
20th-century American women politicians
20th-century American politicians